is a railway station on the Fujikyuko Line in the city of Fujiyoshida, Yamanashi, Japan, operated by private railway operator Fuji Kyuko (Fujikyu).

Lines

Station layout
The station is staffed and consists of an island platform serving two tracks, with the station building located on the south (down) side of the tracks. Passengers cross the track between the platforms via a level crossing. It has a waiting room and toilet facilities. The station is staffed.

Platforms

Blue Train Terrace
On 29 April 2011, an area called the "Shimoyoshida Station Blue Train Terrace" was opened next to the station. This consists of a paved recreation area with tables next to a former 14 series "Blue Train" sleeping car, No. SuHaNeFu 14-20, which was part of the formation of the last run of the Hokuriku overnight service in March 2010. Three freight wagons that formerly ran on the Fujikyu Line are also on preserved on display.

Adjacent stations

History
Shimoyoshida Station opened on 19 June 1929. The station building was reopened on 18 July 2009 following renovation work overseen by industrial designer Eiji Mitooka.

Passenger statistics
In fiscal 1998, the station was used by an average of 280 passengers daily.

Surrounding area
 Chūō Expressway
 
 Shimoyoshida No. 1 Elementary School
 Arakurayama Sengen Park
 Sangoku Daiichisan Arakura Fuji Sengen Shrine

See also
 List of railway stations in Japan

References

External links

 Fujikyuko station information 

Railway stations in Yamanashi Prefecture
Railway stations in Japan opened in 1929
Stations of Fuji Kyuko
Fujiyoshida